Csilla Füri (born 24 April 1972) is a retired modern pentathlete from Hungary. She competed at the 2004 Summer Olympics in Athens, Greece, where she finished eleventh in the women's event with a score of 5,144 points.

Füri is a two-time national modern pentathlon champion, and also led her team to win multiple medals at the World Modern Pentathlon Championships, including two golds (2002 in San Francisco, California, U.S., and 2003 in Pesaro, Italy).

References

External links
  (archived page from Pentathlon.org)
 Profile – Kataca Online 

1972 births
Living people
Hungarian female modern pentathletes
Olympic modern pentathletes of Hungary
Modern pentathletes at the 2004 Summer Olympics
Sportspeople from Budapest
World Modern Pentathlon Championships medalists